Yann Goudy (born 7 November 1975) is a French racing driver.

Goudy raced just once in the International Formula 3000 series. After a hiatus away from racing, he now races in the European Le Mans Series.

Racing history

Career summary

References

1975 births
Living people
French racing drivers
International Formula 3000 drivers
Sportspeople from Nantes
Blancpain Endurance Series drivers
Auto GP drivers
24 Hours of Le Mans drivers
French Formula Three Championship drivers
24 Hours of Spa drivers